James Halford Ramsay (12 February 1930 – 22 August 2013) was an Australian politician. He was a Liberal Party member of the Victorian Legislative Assembly, representing the seat of Balwyn. He was also a minister in the cabinets of Dick Hamer and Lindsay Thompson.

Personal life
James Halford Ramsay was born in Camberwell, Melbourne, on 12 February 1930, the third of four children of Australian-born parents, Alan William Ramsay, printer and publisher, and Beatrice Agnes Ramsay (née Kent), physiotherapist. He was raised with his siblings Tom, Mary and Bill in the family home in Chaucer Crescent, Canterbury, and educated at East Camberwell Primary School before secondary education at Scotch College, Hawthorn.

After working with his father Alan at publisher Ramsay Ware, Jim was elected to the Victorian parliament as the MLA for Balwyn in 1973 where he served for 15 years.

References

1930 births
2013 deaths
Members of the Victorian Legislative Assembly
Liberal Party of Australia members of the Parliament of Victoria
Politicians from Melbourne
Delegates to the Australian Constitutional Convention 1998
20th-century Australian politicians
University of Melbourne alumni
People educated at Scotch College, Melbourne
People from Canterbury, Victoria